DualPenSports, known as  in Japan, is a video game for the Nintendo 3DS published by Namco Bandai under the Bandai label and developed by indies zero. The game gets its name from the fact that two special sports styluses are used to play the game. The sports are soccer, baseball, boxing, basketball, paragliding, archery and skiing. There are also tap exercises to help players get used to playing the game with two styluses rather than one.

Reception

DualPenSports received mixed reviews from critics. On Metacritic, the game holds a score of 58/100 based on 11 reviews.

GameRevolution'''s Kevin Schaller rated the game a 1/10 while criticizing the graphics, character customization and the gameplay for the sports lacking in variety. Zach Kaplan of Nintendo Life described the game's sports styluses as being an "ineffective gimmick" that bring down the entire game while scoring it 4 out of 10 stars. Mike Rose of Pocket Gamer'', scoring the game 3 out of 5 stars, recommended the game for younger children while praising its presentation but described the minigames as being "simple and lifeless".

References

External links
 

2011 video games
Bandai Namco games
Nintendo 3DS games
Nintendo 3DS-only games
Multiple-sport video games
Multiplayer and single-player video games
Video games developed in Japan
Indieszero games